The rent-gap theory was developed in 1979 by the geographer Neil Smith as an economic explanation for the process of gentrification. It describes the disparity between the current rental income of a property and the potentially achievable rental income. Only from this difference arises the interest of investors, to renovate a particular object (to entire neighborhoods), resulting in an increase in rents and also the value of the property.

Investment in the property market will therefore only be made if a rent gap exists. Thus, it is contrary to other explanations for gentrification related to cultural and consumption preferences and housing preferences. The rent-gap theory is a purely economic approach.

While the processes described with the rent-gap theory can be observed especially in North America , the theory is being adapted for other regions of the world, including Chile, Lebanon, and Korea.

Application 
The theory has been used in agent-based modelling of the effects of gentrification on real estate markets.

References

External Link 

 Jürgen Friedrichs, Robert Kecskes, Michael Wagner, Christof Wolf: Applied Sociology . Publisher of Social Science, Wiesbaden 2004, page 26 ff
 Gentrification and the rent gap. N Smith - Annals of the Association of American Geographers, 1987

Economic theories
Urban geography